Morningside is an unincorporated community and census-designated place in Eddy County, New Mexico, United States. Its population was 367 as of the 2010 census. The community is located on the northern border of Artesia west of U.S. Route 285.

Geography
Morningside is located along US Route 285 just north of Artesia.

Demographics

Education
It is within the Artesia Public Schools school district. Artesia High School is the school district's sole comprehensive high school.

References

Census-designated places in New Mexico
Census-designated places in Eddy County, New Mexico